Ravajir (also Romanized as Ravājīr) is a village in Lakan Rural District, in the Central District of Rasht County, Gilan Province, Iran. At the 2006 census, its population was 110, in 28 families.

References 

Populated places in Rasht County